Gamishli-ye Khvajeh Nafas (also Romanized as Gāmīshlī-ye Khvājeh Nafas; also known as Dahaneh Khvājeh Nafas) is a village in Jafarbay-ye Gharbi Rural District, Gomishan District, Torkaman County, Golestan Province, Iran. At the 2006 census, its population was 444, in 87 families.

References 

Populated places in Torkaman County